Elliot R. McVeigh is a Professor of Bioengineering, Medicine and Radiology at the University of California, San Diego (UCSD). His research utilises low dose CT imaging and MR imaging techniques to identify those people at substantially higher risk for heart attacks.

Education
McVeigh earned a BSc in physics in 1984 and a PhD in medical biophysics in 1988 at the University of Toronto.

Career
In 2007 he returned to Johns Hopkins to become the director of the Department of Biomedical Engineering.  During his 8 year tenure as chair the department grew substantially and was continuously ranked #1 in the nation for both undergraduate and graduate training by U.S. News & World Report. He also led the development of a new Master’s program for medical device design through the establishment of the Center of Biomedical Innovation and Design in the department.

In 2015, he was hired by University of California, San Diego  with a joint appointment in the school of engineering and the school of medicine.  He is part of the Altman Clinical and Translational Research Institute (ACTRI) built by UC San Diego in La Jolla. In the Cardiovascular Imaging Lab (CViL) at UCSD, McVeigh and his team work with engineers and clinicians to develop low dose CT imaging and MR imaging techniques that will identify those people at substantially higher risk for heart attacks.

Activities and Honors
 Fellow of American Institute for Medical and Biological Engineering, 2008
 Fellows Award for Research Mentoring, National Institutes of Health, 2007
 Regional Excellence in Tech Transfer Award, Federal Laboratory Consortium, 2005
 Fellow, International Society of Magnetic Resonance in Medicine, 2001
 Established Investigator Award, American Heart Association, 1995 - 1999
 Scholar, Radiological Society of North America, 1990

Selected publications

References

External links
 Personal Profile on Cardiovascular Imaging Lab at UCSD
 Google Scholars 

American bioinformaticians
Living people
Johns Hopkins University faculty
University of California, San Diego faculty
Scientists from California
University of Toronto alumni
1960 births
Fellows of the American Institute for Medical and Biological Engineering